The Norwich Union Grand Prix was a non-ranking snooker tournament staged between 1988 and 1990. Matches were held at various venues across Europe with the final stage being played in Monte Carlo, Monaco. The tournaments were sponsored by Norwich Union, who had last sponsored a snooker tournament, the Norwich Union Open, fourteen years previously.

Winners

References

Norwich Union Grand Prix
Snooker non-ranking competitions
Recurring sporting events established in 1988
Recurring events disestablished in 1990
Defunct snooker competitions